K225 or K-225 may refer to:

K-225 (Kansas highway), a former state highway in Kansas
Kaman K-225, an American experimental helicopter
HMCS Kitchener (K225), a former Canadian Navy ship